The Cincinnati Reds' 1986 season was a season in American baseball. It consisted of the Cincinnati Reds attempting to win the National League West, although falling short in second place behind the Houston Astros.

Eric Davis hit 27 home runs and stole 80 bases this season. The New York Yankees' Rickey Henderson also had over 20 home runs and 80 steals in 1986, he and Davis are the only two major leaguers to accomplish this feat.

Offseason
 December 19, 1985: Jay Tibbs, Andy McGaffigan, John Stuper, and Dann Bilardello were traded by the Reds to the Montreal Expos for Bill Gullickson and Sal Butera.
January 16, 1986: Derek Botelho was signed as a free agent with the Cincinnati Reds.
January 20, 1986: Tony Pérez was signed as a free agent by the Reds.

Regular season
On August 5, 1986, Steve Carlton struck out Eric Davis for the 4000th strikeout of his career.
August 17, 1986: Pete Rose played in the last game of his career. It was a game against the San Diego Padres, and Rose was struck out by Goose Gossage.

Season standings

Record vs. opponents

Notable transactions
March 31, 1986: Wayne Krenchicki was traded by the Reds to the Montreal Expos for Norm Charlton and a player to be named later. The Expos completed the deal by sending Tim Barker (minors) to the Reds on April 2.
April 4, 1986: Chris Welsh was signed as a free agent with the Cincinnati Reds.

Draft picks
June 2, 1986: Reggie Jefferson was drafted by the Reds in the 3rd round of the 1986 amateur draft.

Roster

Player stats

Batting

Starters by position
Note: Pos = Position; G = Games played; AB = At bats; H = Hits; Avg. = Batting average; HR = Home runs; RBI = Runs batted in

Other batters
Note: G = Games played; AB = At bats; H = Hits; Avg. = Batting average; HR = Home runs; RBI = Runs batted in

Pitching

Starting pitchers
Note: G = Games pitched; IP = Innings pitched; W = Wins; L = Losses; ERA = Earned run average; SO = Strikeouts

Other pitchers
Note: G = Games pitched; IP = Innings pitched; W = Wins; L = Losses; ERA = Earned run average; SO = Strikeouts

Relief pitchers
Note: G = Games; W = Wins; L = Losses; SV = Saves; ERA = Earned run average; SO = Strikeouts

Farm system 

LEAGUE CHAMPIONS: Vermont

References

1986 Cincinnati Reds season at Baseball Reference

External links
Cincinnati Reds 1986 Schedule at MLB.com

Cincinnati Reds seasons
Cincinnati Reds Season, 1986
Cinc